Learning Care Group, Inc. is a child care and early childhood education company based in Novi, Michigan, United States. Founded in the 1960s, it is the second-largest for-profit child care provider in North America, operating over 950+ schools under the La Petite Academy, Childtime, Tutor Time, The Children's Courtyard, Montessori Unlimited, Everbrook Academy, Creative Kids Learning Center, U-GRO, Young School, and Pathways Learning Academy brands, primarily in the United States. Learning Care Group is owned by American Securities.

History
Learning Care Group was founded in the 1960s. In 2005, it was purchased by Australia-based ABC Learning. By the time it was acquired by Morgan Stanley Private Equity in March 2008, it operated 1,150 schools under five brands. In 2014, it was acquired by private equity firm American Securities.

References

External links
 

Companies based in Oakland County, Michigan
Child care companies
Companies established in the 1960s